Germán Darío Portanova (born 19 October 1973) is an Argentine football manager and former player. He has played as a midfielder for clubs of Argentina, Chile, Paraguay and Spain. He currently manages the Argentina women's national team.

Coaching career
He coached Argentina in the 2022 Copa América Femenina, guiding the team to qualify for the 2023 FIFA Women's World Cup, making him the first manager other than Carlos Borrello to do so.

External links
 

1973 births
Living people
Argentine footballers
Argentine expatriate footballers
Chacarita Juniors footballers
CSyD Tristán Suárez footballers
Racing de Ferrol footballers
Cerro Porteño players
Deportes Melipilla footballers
Rangers de Talca footballers
Chilean Primera División players
Primera B de Chile players
Expatriate footballers in Chile
Expatriate footballers in Spain
Expatriate footballers in Paraguay
Association football defenders
Argentine football managers
Women's association football managers
Argentina women's national football team managers
Footballers from Buenos Aires